Ruby and Arthur Reed (RNLI Official Number 990) was an  lifeboat of the Royal National Lifeboat Institution (RNLI) stationed at Cromer in the English county of Norfolk from 30 April 1967 and was the No 1 lifeboat between various relief’s until she was replaced after 17 years service by the  Ruby and Arthur Reed II on 16 December 1985. During the time that the Ruby and Arthur Reed was on station at Cromer she performed 125 service launches, rescuing 58 lives.

Design and construction
Ruby and Arthur Reed was built in 1966 at the yard of William Osborne at Littlehampton, West Sussex. She was an Oakley class self-righting design which combined great stability with the ability to self-right in the event of the lifeboat capsizing. This was achieved by a system of shifting water ballast. The system worked by the lifeboat taking on one and half tons of sea water at launching in to a tank built into the base of the hull. If the lifeboat then reached a crucial point of capsize the ballast water would transfer through valves to a righting tank built into the port side. If the capsize was to the starboard side of the lifeboat, the water shift started when an angle of 165° was reached. This would push the boat into completing a full 360° roll. If the capsize was to the port side, the water transfer started at 110°. In this case the weight of water combined with the weight of machinery aboard the lifeboat usually managed to stop the roll and allow the lifeboat to bounce back to upright.

Hull construction
The hull of the Ruby and Arthur Reed was constructed from African mahogany built with two skins. Each skin was diagonally laid with a layer of calico laid between the skins. The outer skin was ⅜ of an inch thick with the inner skin being ¼ of an inch thick. The keel was iron and weighed 1.154 tons. The hull was divided into eleven watertight compartments. She was fitted with twin 110 hp Gardner 6LX six cylinder diesel engines, which moved her over the water at 9 Knots. Ruby and Arthur Reed’s aluminium wheelhouse was positioned amidships and was fully enclosed which provided welcome crew protection from the elements. Aft of the lifeboat there was another cabin which served as the chartroom and also housed all the lifeboats electronic equipment.

Equipment
The lifeboat was fitted with Decca 060 radar and all she carried Pye Westminster VHF and an Ajax MF Radiotelephone. In addition a radio Direction Finding set was carried, which gave a magnetic bearing to a transmitting station. The electric searchlight was standard along with Pains Wessex speedlines.

Service
Ruby and Arthur Reed was on station at Cromer for seventeen years and during that time she was launched 125 times and she saved fifty eight lives. Her first service took place on 4 July 1967 to a motor fishing vessel called Renovate. The fishing boat’s engine had failed and she was at anchor two miles east of Haisborough Sands. Two engineers from the Royal Naval minesweeper  were put aboard to try to repair her. Coxswain Henry "Shrimp" Davies and his lifeboat stood by through the night until the boat's engines were once again working.

Gallery

Service and rescues

References

Cromer lifeboats
1966 ships
Oakley-class lifeboats
Hythe, Hampshire